Urol is a rural locality (a village) in Cherdynsky District, Perm Krai, Russia. The population was 60 as of 2010. There are 3 streets.

Geography 
Urol is located 21 km southwest of Cherdyn (the district's administrative centre) by road. Kushpelevo is the nearest rural locality.

References 

Rural localities in Cherdynsky District